Grottolella is a town and comune in the province of Avellino, Campania, Italy. 
It is famous for its fraction Pozzo del Sale; years ago there was a water well here, with saline water inside, from which people used to get salt for free.

References

Cities and towns in Campania